The Oriental Youngmen's Association was founded in Japan in 1900 to facilitate the cultivation of friendship among Japanese, Indian, and other Asian students studying in Japan. It was an early expression of Pan-Asianism.

References

Organizations established in 1900
Youth organizations based in Japan
Pan-Asianism
Youth organizations established in the 1900s